Shell Shocked is the second studio album by American rapper Mac, released on July 21, 1998 on No Limit Records in the United States. Mac chose to focus his efforts in a more mainstream direction. The album sold over 400,000 copies in the United States. It was almost entirely produced by Beats By the Pound. The album features Storm and contains the hit single "Boss Chick" featuring Mia X.

Commercial performance
The album proved to be Mac's most commercially successful release to date. Shell Shocked charted highly on the Billboard charts, making it to #11 on the US Billboard 200 and #4 on the Top R&B/Hip-Hop Albums chart.

Track listing

Charts

Weekly charts

Year-end charts

References

1998 albums
Mac (rapper) albums
No Limit Records albums
Priority Records albums